Lakis Petropoulos (29 August 1932 – 30 June 1996) was a Greek football player and manager.
He played for Panathinaikos and capped 3 times for Greece. He was also member of the national side for the 1952 Olympic Games, but he did not play in any matches.

He managed Greece, Panathinaikos, Olympiacos, Iraklis Thessaloniki, Cercle Brugge, PAOK, Panionios, Apollon Smyrni and OFI Crete.

References

1932 births
1996 deaths
Greece international footballers
Panathinaikos F.C. players
Greek football managers
Iraklis Thessaloniki F.C. managers
Olympiacos F.C. managers
OFI Crete F.C. managers
PAOK FC managers
Panathinaikos F.C. managers
Panionios F.C. managers
Cercle Brugge K.S.V. managers
Greece national football team managers
Apollon Smyrnis F.C. managers
Anorthosis Famagusta F.C. managers
Olympic footballers of Greece
Footballers at the 1952 Summer Olympics
Association football midfielders
Footballers from Athens
Greek footballers
Greek expatriate football managers